Charles Norton may refer to:

 Charles Norton (solicitor) (1896–1974), managing partner of Norton Rose Fulbright, Chairman of the Hurlingham Club, president of the Law Society and lord mayor of the City of Westminster
 Charles D. Norton (1871–1923), American banker and Assistant Secretary of the Treasury
 Charles Davis Norton (1820–1867), American lawyer and government official
 Charles Eliot Norton (1827–1908), American author, social critic, and professor of art
 Charles Hotchkiss Norton (1851–1942), American mechanical engineer and designer of machine tools
 Charles Phelps Norton (1858–1923), chancellor of the University at Buffalo
 Charles Francis Norton (1807–1835), member of parliament for Guildford